Gonzaga may refer to:

Places 
Gonzaga, Lombardy, commune in the province of Mantua, Italy
Gonzaga, Cagayan, municipality in the Philippines
Gonzaga, Minas Gerais, town in Brazil
Forte Gonzaga, fort in Messina, Sicily

People with the surname Gonzaga
House of Gonzaga, family that ruled Mantua from 1328 to 1708

Federico II Gonzaga, Duke of Mantua (1500–1540), Italian nobleman
Ercole Gonzaga (1505–1563), Italian cardinal
Pirro Gonzaga (cardinal) (1505–1529) Roman Catholic cardinal and Bishop of Modena
Ferrante Gonzaga (1507-1557), commander-in-chief of the Italian army
Giulia Gonzaga (1513–1566), Italian noblewoman
Vincenzo Gonzaga, Duke of Mantua (1562–1612), Italian nobleman
Aloysius Gonzaga (1568–1591), Italian aristocrat and member of the Society of Jesus
Tomás António Gonzaga (1744– 1810), Portuguese-Brazilian poet
Chiquinha Gonzaga (1847–1935), Brazilian composer
Antonio Gonzaga ( 1875), Argentine chef and cookbook writer
Luiz Gonzaga (1912–1989), Brazilian musician
Gabriel Gonzaga (born 1979), Brazilian mixed martial arts fighter
Wélissa Gonzaga (born 1982), Brazilian volleyball player
Ginger Gonzaga (born 1983), American comedian and actress
Toni Gonzaga (born 1984), Filipina actress
Alex Gonzaga (born 1988), Filipina actress

People with the given name Gonzaga
Gonzaga Gonza, one of the Uganda Martyrs

Schools

High schools
Gonzaga College in Dublin, Ireland
Gonzaga College High School in Washington, D.C., United States
Gonzaga High School in St. John's, Canada
Gonzaga Preparatory School  in Spokane, United States
Kolese Gonzaga in Jakarta, Indonesia
St. Aloysius Gonzaga Secondary School in Mississauga, Canada

Universities
Gonzaga University, in Spokane, United States
Gonzaga Bulldogs, athletic program of Gonzaga University

See also